Smestad may refer to the following locations:

Smestad, Oslo in Oslo, Norway
Smestad (station), a metro station in Oslo.
Smestad, Akershus in Rælingen, Akershus, Norway